The men's 100 metres at the 2007 All-Africa Games were held on July 18–19.

Medalists

Results

Heats
Qualification: First 3 of each heat (Q) and the next 6 fastest (q) qualified for the semifinals.

Wind:Heat 1: +0.7 m/s, Heat 2: 0.0 m/s, Heat 3: -1.1 m/s, Heat 4: -0.9 m/s, Heat 5: 0.0 m/s, Heat 6: -0.4 m/s

Semifinals
Qualification: First 2 of each semifinal (Q) and the next 2 fastest (q) qualified for the final.

Wind:Heat 1: 0.0 m/s, Heat 2: 0.0 m/s, Heat 3: -0.4 m/s

Final
Wind: +0.6 m/s

References
Results

100
2007